Klosterstræde 21 is a four-storey building in the Old Town of Copenhagen, Denmark. It has since its completion in 1817 been home to a glazier's business. The current owner, H. P. Plsem & Søn, which has been based in the building since 1938, has replaced all the windows with antique stained glass windows. The building was listed on the Danish registry of protected buildings and places in 1950.

History
Peter Christian Weinreich Fischer (1772–1834) established a glazier's business at the site on 20 June 1796. The adjacent building at Klosterstræde 23 was constructed for him in 1811–12. Klosterstræde 21 was constructed for him in 1814–1817 and he subsequently ran his glazier's business from the premises. Finnur Magnússon, who then worked for the King's private archives, was from 1827 and until his death ten years later also among the residents in the building.

The building and firm was, after the founder's death, handed down to his son, Peter Didrik Weinreich Fischer (1813–1884). He served as alderman for the Glaziers' Guild in 1845–47 and again in 1851–53. He had by Frederick VII been commissioned to create four glass paintings for Christian IV's Chapel at Roskilde Cathedral. They were never used as originally intended but two of them can now be seen in Frederiksborg Chapel. The two others were destroyed in the fire of Christiansborg Palace in 1884.

In 1871, Fuscher sold the family business to A. W. C. K. Wriedt (1833–1907). Wriedt's son, Ludwig Wriedt (b. 1879), took over the operations in 1904 .

On 1 December 1938, it was acquired by a competitor, H. P. Olsen & Søn, a firm founded on 1 January 1891 by 1891 by Hans Peter Olsen (1863–1935). It has until then been located first at Hyskenstræde 14 and then (from 1932) at Kompagnistræde 2. Olsen's son Robert Hermann Bodholt Olsen (b. 1895) was from 1922 the sole owner of the company. His son, Hermann Arne Bodholt Olsen (b. 1920), was made a partner in 1943.

Architecture
 
The building consists of four storeys over a raised cellar and is four bays wide. The facade is dressed in a grey colour on the ground floor and cellar while the rest stands in undressed, red brick. All the windows have by H. P. Olsen & Søn been replaced by antique stained glass windows from other buildings in Copenhagen, none of which are identical. The name of the company is written in copper lettering above the windows of the ground flor. Mounted on the facade between the two central windows of the first floor is an old rough iron sign. The gate in the left-hand side of the building opens to a small courtyard. A door in the wall of the gateway provides access to the main staircase of the building. The building was listed on the Danish registry of protected buildings and places in 1950.

Today
H. P. Olsen & Co. is based in the ground floor and cellar. A single apartment occupies each of the upper floors.

Gallery

See also
 Sværtegade 3

References

External links

Listed buildings and structures in Copenhagen
Commercial buildings completed in 1918
1817 establishments in Denmark